The 2014–15 BYU Cougars men's basketball team represented Brigham Young University in the 2014–15 NCAA Division I men's basketball season. It was head coach Dave Rose's tenth season at BYU and the Cougars fourth season in the West Coast Conference. The Cougars  once again played their home games at the Marriott Center. They finished the season 25–10, 13–5 in WCC play to finish in a tie for second place. They advanced to the championship game of the WCC tournament where they lost to Gonzaga. They received an at-large bid to the NCAA tournament where they lost in the First Four to Ole Miss.

Before the season

Departures

Recruiting
BYU has signed five recruits for the 2014-15 season. Two of BYU's recruits will head out on their missions immediately and return for the 2016-17 season. Ryan Andrus, Jake Toolson, and Dalton Nixon will play at least one season before heading out on missions.

2013–14 returned missionaries
After returning in the winter and greyshirting, Isaac Neilson will begin his first full season of playing games for the Cougars. Jordan Chatman also returns from his mission and after a summer of working out will be able to play for the Cougars immediately. The Cougars also received surprising news in July. After growing to 6' 10" on his mission, Corban Kaufusi would choose to play basketball instead of football.

Transfers
BYU introduces three new faces from transfers to the 2013-14 roster. Chase Fischer will be eligible to play immediately after sitting out as a redshirt from Wake Forest all last season. Jamal Aytes will be eligible to start playing for the Cougars after the fall semester ends, near the end of December. Kyle Davis also transferred from Utah State and will redshirt the 2014-15 season.

2014–15 media

Nu Skin Cougar IMG Sports Network

KSL 102.7 FM and 1160 AM- Flagship Station (Salt Lake City/ Provo, UT and ksl.com)
BYU Radio- Nationwide (Dish Network 980, Sirius XM 143, and byuradio.org)
KTHK- Blackfoot/ Idaho Falls/ Pocatello/ Rexburg, ID
KMGR- Manti, UT
KSUB- Cedar City, UT
KDXU- St. George, UT

Roster

Schedule

|-
!colspan=8 style="background:#002654; color:#FFFFFF;"|Exhibition

|-
!colspan=8 style="background:#002654; color:white;"| Regular season

|-
!colspan=8 style="background:#002654;"| WCC tournament

|-
!colspan=8 style="background:#002654;"| NCAA tournament

Game summaries

Cougar Tipoff
Broadcasters: Spencer Linton, Jarom Jordan, & Lauren Francom
Starting Lineups:
BYU Blue: Tyler Haws, Frank Bartley IV, Anson Winder, Kyle Davis, Luke Worthington (Dalton Nixon, Corbin Kaufusi, Jordan Chatman bench)- 1st HalfChase Fischer, Tyler Haws, Josh Sharp, Anson Winder, Skyler Halford (Isaac Neilson, Corbin Kaufusi bench)- 2nd Half
BYU White: Josh Sharp, Skyler Halford, Issac Neilson, Jake Toolson, Chase Fischer (Jordan Ellis, Ryan Andrus bench)- 1st HalfJordan Ellis, Jake Toolson, Kyle Davis, Frank Bartley IV, Luke Worthington (Ryan Andrus, Jordan Chatman, Dalton Nixon bench)- 2nd Half
Players that sat out: Nate Austin (back), Kyle Collinsworth (precautionary), Jamal Aytes (ankle)

Colorado School of Mines
Broadcasters: Dave McCann, Blaine Fowler, & Lauren Francom
Starting Lineups:
Colorado School of Mines: Trevor Ritchie, Brian Muller, Caleb Waitsman, Gokul Natesan, Joe Dellenbach
BYU: Chase Fischer, Tyler Haws, Josh Sharp, Anson Winder, Luke Worthington

Seattle Pacific
Broadcasters: Dave McCann, Blaine Fowler, & Spencer Linton
Starting Lineups:
Seattle Pacific: Riley Stockton, Brendan Carroll, Matt Borton, Garrett Swanson, Cory Hutsen
BYU: Chase Fischer, Tyler Haws, Kyle Collinsworth, Josh Sharp, Luke Worthington

Long Beach State
Broadcasters: Dave McCann, Blaine Fowler, & Spencer Linton
Series History: BYU leads series 5-4
Starting Lineups:
Long Beach State: Mike Caffey, McKay Lasalle, Jack Williams, David Samuels, Branford Jones
BYU: Chase Fischer, Tyler Haws, Kyle Collinsworth, Nate Austin, Luke Worthington

Arkansas-Little Rock
Broadcasters: Dave McCann, Blaine Fowler, & Spencer Linton
Series History: First Meeting
Starting Lineups:
Arkansas-Little Rock: Roger Woods, J.T. Thomas, James Reid, Ben Dillard, James White 
BYU: Chase Fischer, Tyler Haws, Kyle Collinsworth, Nate Austin, Luke Worthington

Southern Virginia
Broadcasters: Dave McCann, Blaine Fowler, & Spencer Linton
Series History: First Meeting
Starting Lineups:
Southern Virginia: Preston Eaton, Wesley Eavns, Kaleio Manuela, Kevin Walker, Justin Langford
BYU: Chase Fischer, Tyler Haws, Skyler Halford, Nate Austin, Luke Worthington

Maui Invitational: San Diego State 
Broadcasters: Sean McDonough & Fran Fraschilla
Series History: BYU leads series 48-23
Starting Lineups:
San Diego State: Skylar Spencer, Dwayne Poole II, Trey Kell, Winston Shephard, JJ O'Brien
BYU: Chase Fischer, Tyler Haws, Kyle Collinsworth, Nate Austin, Luke Worthington

Maui Invitational: Chaminade 
Broadcasters: Jon Sciambi & Miles Simon
Series History: BYU leads series 1-0
Starting Lineups:
Chaminade: Lee Bailey, Kuany Kuany, Kevin Hu, Frankie Eteuati, Kiran Shastri
BYU: Chase Fischer, Tyler Haws, Kyle Collinsworth, Nate Austin, Luke Worthington

Maui Invitational: Purdue 
Broadcasters: Jon Sciambi & Miles Simon
Series History: BYU leads series 1-0
Starting Lineups:
Purdue: Jon Octeus, Vince Edwards, A.J. Hammons, Kendall Stephens, Raphael Davis
BYU: Chase Fischer, Tyler Haws, Kyle Collinsworth, Nate Austin, Luke Worthington

Eastern Kentucky
Broadcasters: Dave McCann, Blaine Fowler, & Lauren Francom
Series History: BYU leads series 2-1
Starting Lineups:
Eastern Kentucky: Corey Walden, Isaac McGlone, Timmy Knipp, Ja'Mill Powell, Eric Stutz
BYU: Chase Fischer, Tyler Haws, Kyle Collinsworth, Nate Austin, Isaac Neilson

Utah State
Broadcasters: Rich Waltz & Pete Gillen
Series History: BYU leads series 138-92
Starting Lineups:
BYU: Chase Fischer, Tyler Haws, Kyle Collinsworth, Nate Austin, Luke Worthington
Utah State: Darius Perkins, David Collette, Jalen Moore, Jojo McGlaston, Chris Smith

Hawaii
Broadcasters: Dave McCann, Blaine Fowler, & Spencer Linton
Series History: BYU leads series 32-13
Starting Lineups:
Hawaii: Garrett Nevels, Roderick Bobbitt, Quincy Smith, Aaron Valdes, Mike Thomas
BYU: Chase Fischer, Tyler Haws, Kyle Collinsworth, Nate Austin, Luke Worthington

Utah
Broadcasters: Roxy Bernstein & Miles Simon
Series History: BYU leads series 129-126
Starting Lineups:
Utah: Brandon Taylor, Chris Reyes, Kenneth Ogbe, Jakob Poeltl, Delon Wright
BYU: Chase Fischer, Tyler Haws, Kyle Collinsworth, Nate Austin, Luke Worthington

Weber State
Broadcasters: Steve Klauke, Phil Johnson, & Tony Parks
Series History: BYU leads series 29-10
Starting Lineups:
BYU: Chase Fischer, Tyler Haws, Kyle Collinsworth, Isaac Neilson, Luke Worthington
Weber State: Joel Bolomboy, Richaud Gittens, Jeremy Senglin, Kyndahl Hill, James Hajek

Stanford
Broadcasters: Rich Cellini & Miles Simon
Series History: BYU leads series 5-2
Starting Lineups:
Stanford: Stefan Nastic, Chasson Randle, Dorian Pickens, Anthony Brown, Reid Travis
BYU: Chase Fischer, Tyler Haws, Kyle Collinsworth, Isaac Neilson, Luke Worthington

UMass
Broadcasters: Dave McCann & Blaine Fowler
Series History: UMass leads series 1-0
Starting Lineups:
UMass: Maxie Esho, Derrick Gordon, Jabarie Hinds, Trey Davis, Cady Lalanne
BYU: Chase Fischer, Tyler Haws, Kyle Collinsworth, Isaac Neilson, Luke Worthington

Gonzaga
Broadcasters: Dave Flemming & Stan Heath
Series History: Gonzaga leads series 7-3
Starting Lineups: 
Gonzaga: Kevin Pangos, Gary Bell Jr., Byron Wesley, Przemek Karnowski, Kyle Wiltjer
BYU: Chase Fischer, Tyler Haws, Kyle Collinsworth, Isaac Neilson, Luke Worthington

Portland
Broadcasters: Dave McCann, Blaine Fowler, & Spencer Linton
Series History: BYU leads series 10-1
Starting Lineups:
Portland: Bryce Pressley, Alec Wintering, Thomas Van Der Mars, Riley Barker, Volodymyr Gerun
BYU: Chase Fischer, Tyler Haws, Kyle Collinsworth, Anson Winder, Luke Worthington

Santa Clara
Broadcasters: Dave McCann & Blaine Fowler
Series History: BYU leads series 21-5
Starting Lineups:
BYU: Chase Fischer, Tyler Haws, Kyle Collinsworth, Anson Winder, Luke Worthington
Santa Clara: Brandon Clark, Denzel Johnson, Matt Hubbard, Jared Brownridge, Nate Kratch

San Francisco
Broadcasters: Glen Kuiper & Dan Belluomini
Series History: BYU leads series 11-7
Starting Lineups:
BYU: Chase Fischer, Tyler Haws, Kyle Collinsworth, Anson Winder, Luke Worthington
USF: Matt Glover, Kruize Pinkins, Devin Watson, Mark Tollefsen, Tim Derksen

Pepperdine
Broadcasters: John Brickley & Mo Cassara
Series History: BYU leads series 9-5
Starting Lineups:
Pepperdine: Jeremy Major, Atif Russell, Shawn Olden, A.J. John, Jett Raines
BYU: Chase Fischer, Tyler Haws, Kyle Collinsworth, Anson Winder, Luke Worthington

Loyola Marymount
Broadcasters: Dave McCann, Jarom Jordan, & Spencer Linton
Series History: BYU leads series 6-4
Starting Lineups:
LMU: Godwin Okonji, Chase Flint, Ayodeji Egbeyemi, Marin Mornar, David Humphries
BYU: Chase Fischer, Tyler Haws, Kyle Collinsworth, Anson Winder, Luke Worthington

Pacific
Broadcasters: Roxy Bernstein & Corey Williams
Series History: Series even 4-4
Starting Lineups:
BYU: Chase Fischer, Tyler Haws, Kyle Collinsworth, Skyler Halford, Luke Worthington
Pacific: TJ Wallace, Eric Thompson, Ray Bowles, David Taylor, Sami Eleraky

Saint Mary's
Broadcasters: Beth Mowins & Stan Heath
Series History: BYU leads series 10-6
Starting Lineups:
BYU: Chase Fischer, Tyler Haws, Kyle Collinsworth, Skyler Halford, Luke Worthington
SMC: Brad Waldow, Kerry Carter, Aaron Bright, Garrett Jackson, Desmond Simmons

San Diego
Broadcasters: Barry Tompkins & Casey Jacobsen
Series History: BYU leads series 8-2
Starting Lineups:
BYU: Chase Fischer, Tyler Haws, Kyle Collinsworth, Anson Winder, Luke Worthington
USD: Chris Anderson, Johnny Dee, Duda Sanadze, Simi Fajemisin, Brett Bailey

San Francisco
Broadcasters: Roxy Bernstein & Corey Williams
Series History: BYU leads series 12-7
Starting Lineups:
USF: Matt Glover, Kruize Pinkins, Devin Watson, Marl Tollefsen, Tim Derksen
BYU: Chase Fischer, Tyler Haws, Kyle Collinsworth, Anson Winder, Corbin Kaufusi

Santa Clara
Broadcasters: Spencer Linton, Blaine Fowler, & Lauren Francom
Series History: BYU leads series 22-5
Starting Lineups:
Santa Clara: Brandon Clark, Denzel Johnson, Matt Hubbard, Jared Brownridge, Nate Kratch
BYU: Tyler Haws, Anson Winder, Skyler Halford, Dalton Nixon, Corbin Kaufusi

Pepperdine
Broadcasters: Steve Quis, Dan Dickau, & Kelli Tennant
Series History: BYU leads series 9-6
Starting Lineups:
BYU: Tyler Haws, Kyle Collinsworth, Anson Winder, Dalton Nixon, Corbin Kaufusi
Pepperdine: Amadi Udenyi, Stacy Davis, A.J. Lapray, Shawn Olden, Jett Raines

Loyola Marymount
Broadcasters: Barry Tompkins & Casey Jacobsen
Series History: BYU leads series 7-4
Starting Lineups:
BYU: Chase Fischer, Tyler Haws, Kyle Collinsworth, Josh Sharp, Corbin Kaufusi
LMU: Matt Hayes, Godwin Okonji, Chase Flint, Marin Mornar, David Humphries

Saint Mary's
Broadcasters: Trey Bender & Stan Heath
Series History: BYU leads series 10-7
Starting Lineups:
SMC: Brad Waldow, Kerry Carter, Garrett Jackson, Desmond Simmons, Emmett Naar
BYU: Chase Fischer, Tyler Haws, Kyle Collinsworth, Josh Sharp, Corbin Kaufusi

Pacific
Broadcasters: Dave McCann, Blaine Fowler, & Spencer Linton
Series History: BYU leads series 5-4
Starting Lineups:
Pacific: T.J. Wallace, Gabriel Aguirre, Eric Thompson, Ray Bowles, David Taylor
BYU: Chase Fischer, Tyler Haws, Kyle Collinsworth, Josh Sharp, Corbin Kaufusi

San Diego
Broadcasters: Roxy Bernstein & Corey Williams
Series History: BYU leads series 8-3
Starting Lineups:
USD: Chris Anderson, Johnny Dee, Brandon Perry, Duda Sanadze, Jito Kok
BYU: Chase Fischer, Tyler Haws, Kyle Collinsworth, Josh Sharp, Corbin Kaufusi

Portland
Broadcasters: Tom Glasgow & Jack Sikma
Series History: BYU leads series 11-1
Starting Lineups:
BYU: Chase Fischer, Tyler Haws, Kyle Collinsworth, Josh Sharp, Corbin Kaufusi
Portland: Kevin Bailey, Bryce Pressley, Alec Wintering, Thomas Van Der Mars, Volodymyr Gerun

Gonzaga
Broadcasters: Beth Mowins & Stan Heath
Series History: Gonzaga leads series 8-3
Starting Lineups:
BYU: Chase Fischer, Tyler Haws, Kyle Collinsworth, Josh Sharp, Corbin Kaufusi
Gonzaga: Kevin Pangos, Gary Bell Jr., Byron Wesley, Prezemek Karnowski, Kyle Wiltjer

Quarterfinal: Santa Clara
Broadcasters: Beth Mowins & Stan Heath
Series History: BYU leads 23-5
Starting Lineups:
Santa Clara: Brandon Clark, Jarvis Pugh, Denzel Johnson, Jared Brownridge, Nate Kratch
BYU: Chase Fischer, Tyler Haws, Kyle Collinsworth, Josh Sharp, Corbin Kaufusi

Semifinal: Portland
Broadcasters: Beth Mowins, Stan Heath, & Jeff Goodman
Series History: BYU leads 12-1
Starting Lineups:
Portland: Kevin Bailey, Bryce Pressley, Alec Wintering, Jason Todd, Thomas Van Der Mars
BYU: Chase Fischer, Tyler Haws, Kyle Collinsworth, Josh Sharp, Corbin Kaufusi

Championship: Gonzaga
Broadcasters: Dave Pasch, Sean Farnham, & Jeff Goodman (ESPN)
Kevin Calabro & P.J. Carlesimo (Westwood One)
Series History: Gonzaga leads series 8-4
Starting Lineups:
BYU: Chase Fischer, Tyler Haws, Kyle Collinsworth, Josh Sharp, Corbin Kaufusi
Gonzaga: Kevin Pangos, Gary Bell Jr., Byron Wesley, Prezemek Karnowski, Kyle Wiltjer

First Four: Ole Miss
Broadcasters: Brian Anderson, Steve Smith, & Lewis Johnson (TruTV)
Brandon Gaudin & Alaa Abdelnaby (Westwood One) 
Series History: First Meeting
Starting Lineups:
BYU: Chase Fischer, Tyler Haws, Kyle Collinsworth, Josh Sharp, Corbin Kaufusi
Ole Miss: M.J. Rhett, Sebastian Saiz, Martavious Newby, Jarvis Summers, Stefan Moody

References

2014-15
2014–15 West Coast Conference men's basketball season
2014 in sports in Utah
2015 in sports in Utah
2015 NCAA Division I men's basketball tournament participants